The Scold's Bridle (1994) is a crime novel by English writer Minette Walters. The book, Walters' third, won a CWA Gold Dagger.

Synopsis
Mathilda Gillespie, an eccentric recluse known for her incredible meanness of nature, is found dead in her bathtub, her wrists slashed and her head locked inside a so-called 'scold's bridle', a rusted cage built with tongue clamps which was used as a torture device throughout the middle ages. The dead woman's only friend, Dr. Sarah Blakeney, becomes the prime suspect in her murder after police discover that she's been left a great deal of money in the will.

To clear her name, Sarah delves deep into Mathilda's mysterious past, and subsequently unravels an intricate web of greed, abuse and depravity.

Television adaptation
In 1998,  The Scold's Bridle was adapted for television by the BBC.  It was directed by David Thacker from a screenplay written by Tony Bicât; producer Chris Parr, editor St John O'Rorke, music Junior Campbell.

the cast included:

Miranda Richardson as Dr. Sarah Blakeney
Bob Peck as Detective Sergeant Cooper
Douglas Hodge as Jack Blakeney
Siân Phillips as Mathilda Gillespie
Trudie Styler as Joanna Lascelles
Paul Brooke as Duncan Orloff
Virginia McKenna as Violet Orloff
Beth Winslet as Ruth Lascelles
Rosie Wiggins as Young Mathilda Gillespie
John Duval as Sir William Cavendish 
Christine Moore as Jenny Spede
Randal Herley as Dr. Cameron
Nick Malinowski as Young Detective Constable
Alan Williams as Bob Spede
Rosemary Martin as Jane Merryman
Tenniel Evans as Paul Merryman
Oona Beeson as Polly Graham
Miles Anderson as Detective Inspector Harmer
Alan MacNaughtan as James Gillespie
Hugh Bonneville as Tim Duggan

References

External links 
More about The Scold's Bridle on Walters' website
Agent's dedicated page

1994 British novels
British novels adapted into television shows
Novels by Minette Walters
Macmillan Publishers books